The 2020 NextEra Energy 250 was a NASCAR Gander RV & Outdoors Truck Series race held on February 14, 2020. Contested over 106 laps due to an overtime finish, on the  asphalt superspeedway. It was the first race of the 2020 NASCAR Gander RV & Outdoors Truck Series season. This race is known for being the closest Daytona finish in the truck series, as Grant Enfinger beat Jordan Anderson by 0.010 of a second.

Entry list 

*Withdrew.

Practice

First practice 

Final practice 

Qualifying 

Qualifying results

Race

Race results

Stage Results 
Stage One
Laps: 25

Stage Two Laps: 16

Final Stage Results 
Laps: 65

References 

NextEra Energy 250
NextEra Energy 250
NASCAR races at Daytona International Speedway
2020 NASCAR Gander RV & Outdoors Truck Series